OOTP may refer to:
 Harry Potter and the Order of the Phoenix
 Harry Potter and the Order of the Phoenix (film)
 Harry Potter and the Order of the Phoenix (video game)
 Out of the Park Baseball